Timothy Stansfeld Engleheart (1803–1879), was an English engraver.

He engraved some of the plates in ‘The British Museum Marbles,’ but seems to have removed to Darmstadt, as there is a fine engraving by him of ‘Ecce Homo,’ after Guido Reni, executed at Darmstadt in 1840.

References

External Link
 by Alexander Chisholm, engraved by Engleheart for Fisher's Drawing Room Scrap Book, 1837 and with a poetical illustration by Letitia Elizabeth Landon.

1803 births
1879 deaths
English engravers
19th-century engravers